Fabian Dörfler (born 8 September 1983 in Bayreuth) is a German slalom canoeist who competed at the international level from 2001 to 2014.

He won four medals at the ICF Canoe Slalom World Championships with three golds (K1: 2005; K1 team: 2007, 2010) and a silver (K1: 2007). He won the overall World Cup title in K1 in 2005 and 2007. He also won seven medals at the European Championships (2 golds, 3 silvers and 2 bronzes).

World Cup individual podiums

1 World Championship counting for World Cup points
2 European Championship counting for World Cup points
3 Pan American Championship counting for World Cup points

References

 - accessed 12 September 2010.

German male canoeists
Living people
1983 births
Medalists at the ICF Canoe Slalom World Championships
Sportspeople from Bayreuth